Hatch Municipal Airport  is a city-owned, public airport three miles southwest of village of Hatch, in Doña Ana County, New Mexico, United States.

E05 is a landing rights airport and is just off NM 26 outside Placitas.

The airport is used largely by general aviation, and United States military and law enforcement. The nearest commercial air travel is available at El Paso International Airport or Albuquerque International Sunport.

Hatch Chile Festival is held at the Hatch Municipal Airport annually during the Labor Day weekend.

Facilities and aircraft 
Hatch Municipal Airport covers 166 acres (67 ha) at an elevation of 4,129 feet (1,259 m) above mean sea level. It has one runway: 11/29 is 4,110 by 60 feet (1,253 x 18 m) asphalt.

In the year ending April 8, 2017 the airport had an average of 48 operations per week: 4% military, 90% local general aviation, 6% transient general aviation.

No aircraft are based at this airport. In addition to general aviation, the airport is used by agricultural aircraft for crop dusting.

History
Hatch Municipal Airport was activated in February 1953. In 2000 it underwent a total reconstruction, which completed the airport runway 11/29 and associated taxiways. The new runway 11/29 was constructed to a width of 60 feet and a length of 4,110 feet. During the reconstruction project, the new runway also completed a paved turn around on the south end and a 300 by 300 foot paved apron on the east end of the runway with aircraft tie downs. Subsequent projects have completed a paved access road with vehicle parking, paved taxiways and hangar pad sites for both commercial and agricultural use. Security fencing and automated entrance gates were included in the airport improvements.

References

External links 

Airports in New Mexico
Transportation in Doña Ana County, New Mexico
Buildings and structures in Doña Ana County, New Mexico